The Mittlerer Panzer 1958 or Panzer 58 was a medium tank of Swiss design. Twelve tanks were produced and later converted to Panzer 61s.

History and development
After World War II, Switzerland was only equipped with outdated fighting vehicles of foreign production such as the Hetzer. Switzerland sought to purchase new armored fighting vehicles but was unable to do so due to other nations' involvement in the Korean War. Thus, in 1953 funding was allocated for the development of a domestic medium tank. The first prototype was completed by Eidgenoessische Konstruktionswerkstaette in 1957 and was designated as Panzer 58. The main armament of the first prototype was a domestic 90 mm cannon. A second prototype was equipped with a British Ordnance QF 20 pounder. Another ten tanks armed with the 105 mm cannon were manufactured from 1960 to 1961.

Vehicle systems
The drive unit was compact and modular and thus could be installed as a unit easily. It consisted of the motor, auxiliary motor, drive and steering gear, power transmission and radiator. The auxiliary engine was a four-cylinder diesel engine and was used to drive the main generator and the power supply. In case of a problem with the main motor, the tank could be driven with the auxiliary engine via the auxiliary transmission, over short distances. The transmission was an SLM with 6 forward and 2 reverse gears. The foot brake and parking brake consisted of two brake bands on the left and right sides of the gearbox. The turret was located in the center of the tank.

Crew
The crew of the Panzer 58 consisted of a Commander, Driver, Loader, and Gunner.

Use
Between 1958 and 1964 the Panzer 58 was in service with the Swiss Army. Eventually, the vehicles were converted to and used as the Panzer 61.

Legacy
The lessons learned with the Panzer 58 project were the basis of the Panzer 61. This project served in the development of Switzerland's armored doctrine throughout the cold war and into the modern day; even modern Swiss Leopard 2 tanks are modified to conform to the unique demands of Switzerland that were born to a large extent from the Panzer 58 project.

Surviving examples
The prototype with the M plate No. M0895 is on display at the Panzermuseum Thun in Thun, Switzerland

References

 Military Museum Thun BE Switzerland
 Ogerkiewicz, R. M. AFV Weapons Profile No. 50: Swiss Battle Tanks. Profile Publications, 1972. Print.

External links
 Book Urs Heller: Die Panzer der schweizer Armee von 1920 bis 2008
  Technical details Mittlerer Panzer 58

 Yuri Pasholok, tank historian

Tanks of Switzerland
Medium tanks of the Cold War
Military vehicles introduced in the 1950s